The 1995 Clemson Tigers baseball team represented Clemson University in the 1995 NCAA Division I baseball season. The team played their home games at Beautiful Tiger Field in Clemson, South Carolina.

The team was coached by Jack Leggett, who completed his second season at Clemson.  The Tigers reached the 1995 College World Series, their seventh appearance in Omaha.

Roster

Schedule

References

Clemson
Clemson Tigers baseball seasons
College World Series seasons
Clemson baseball
Clemson